Nicholas “Nico” Rittmeyer (born 13 October 1993) is a retired footballer who played as an attacking midfielder for USL Championship club Charleston Battery. Born in the United States, he represented the Guatemala national team. He was forced to retire at an early age after suffering an injury.

Career

Professional
Rittmeyer played fours years of college soccer, starting at the University of North Carolina at Chapel Hill in 2013, before transferring to the College of Charleston in 2014.

Rittmeyer also played with USL PDL side South Georgia Tormenta in 2016.

Rittmeyer signed with United Soccer League club Charleston Battery on 22 March 2017. He made his professional debut on 14 June 2017 as an 82nd minute substitute during a 3-2 loss to Atlanta United FC in the Lamar Hunt U.S. Open Cup.

International
On 29 October 2020, Rittmeyer received his first call-up to the Guatemala senior national team. He made his debut on 23 January 2021.

References

1993 births
Living people
People with acquired Guatemalan citizenship
Guatemalan footballers
Association football midfielders
Guatemala international footballers
Sportspeople from Savannah, Georgia
Soccer players from Georgia (U.S. state)
American soccer players
Charleston Battery players
North Carolina Tar Heels men's soccer players
USL Championship players
USL League Two players
American people of Guatemalan descent
American sportspeople of North American descent
Sportspeople of Guatemalan descent